Ayr/Sargeant Private Airfield  is located  northwest of Ayr, Ontario, Canada.

References

Registered aerodromes in Ontario

pms:Atwood - Coghlin Airport